Bonaventura Aliotti, O.F.M., (1640 in Palermo – 1690), was an Italian Franciscan friar, organist and composer.

Aliotti, also known as Padre Palermino, worked in Palermo and like his teacher Giovanni Battista Fasolo belonged to the Franciscan Order. In 1671 he moved to Padua and then in 1674 to Ferrara as organist of the lay confraternity Confraternita della Morte. Four of his eleven oratorios survive.

Works
Il Sansone (1686)
Il Trionfo della morte per il peccato d’Adamo (1685)
Santa Rosalia (1687)

References

1640 births
1690 deaths
Musicians from Palermo
17th-century Italian composers
Italian male composers
Italian organists
Male organists
Italian Friars Minor
17th-century Italian Roman Catholic priests
17th-century male musicians